Flag waver, Flag Waver or Flagwaver may refer to:

 "Flag Waver", a composition by Jerry Gray 
 Flag waver, a piece in Ko shogi, a variant of the Japanese board game shogi
 Flag Waver, winner of the 1983 Rampart Stakes American Thoroughbred horse race
 Flagwaver, a Journal of Vexillology, a semi-annual Great Waters Association of Vexillology publication